The flag of North Korea, also known as the Ramhongsaek Konghwagukgi (literally "blue and red-coloured flag of the republic"), sometimes known as the flag of the Democratic People's Republic of Korea, consists of a central red panel, bordered both above and below by a narrow white stripe and a broad blue stripe. The central red panel bears a five-pointed red star within a white circle near the hoist. The flag is strictly prohibited under the National Security Act in South Korea due to its association with the ruling North Korean regime, and it is only allowed in extremely exceptional cases such as media coverage, drama and film shooting, and international sports events.

Design
The North Korean national flag is officially defined in article 170 of Chapter VII of the North Korean constitution. According to it:

Symbolism

The North Korean flag's prominent motif is a red star, which is a universal symbol of communism and socialism, although since the flag's adoption the application of the Marxist–Leninist-natured philosophy of Juche has replaced communist authority as the state's guiding ideology, and references to communism have been systematically removed from the country's constitution and legal documents. However, the constitution is still stated to be socialist in nature. Despite the many changes to the constitution, the description of the flag has always remained the same.

The website of the Korean Friendship Association indicates that, on the contrary, the red star represents revolutionary traditions and the red panel is indicative of the patriotism and determination of the Korean people. The white stripes symbolize the unity of the Korean nation and its culture. The blue stripes represent the desire to fight for independence, peace, friendship, and international unity.

According to a typical North Korean official text published in Rodong Sinmun, Kim Il-sung gave the following significance to the flag's elements:

The colours of the North Korean flag – red, white, and blue – are considered national colours and symbolise respectively: revolutionary traditions; purity, strength, and dignity; and sovereignty, peace, and friendship.

Treatment
According to Korea expert and scholar Brian Reynolds Myers, in North Korea the flag of the Workers' Party of Korea and the Korean People's Army Supreme Commander's personal standard are treated with more reverence than the North Korean national flag, with the Supreme Commander's flag ranking highest among the three in terms of reverence.

History

Background
In the late 19th and early 20th centuries, the Korean Peninsula was ruled by a monarchy known as the Korean Empire. During this time, the Korean monarchy used a flag now known as the Taegukgi as its national flag. It featured a yin-yang symbol surrounded by four trigrams. The Taegukgi flag remained as the symbol of Korea after Imperial Japan occupied and annexed the Korean Peninsula in 1910.

In 1945, World War II ended with an Allied victory and Japan was defeated. Per Allied terms, Japan relinquished its control over the Korean Peninsula, with the Soviet Union occupying the northern half of Korea and the U.S. occupying the southern half of it. The northern portion of the Korean Peninsula became a socialist republic supported by the Soviet Union following the restoration of independence of Korea in 1945, the Taegukgi was re-adopted there.

Inception
In 1947 the Soviets communicated via Major General  to discuss whether the Taegukgi flag should be kept for newly founded North Korea. Vice Chairman of the Provisional People's Committee for North Korea Kim Tu-bong was in favor of keeping the Taegukgi. However, for Lebedev, the concept of Chinese philosophy, which the design of the Taegukgi is based on, appear to him as medieval superstition, so he wanted to change to a new flag. Tu-bong yielded and a few months later the design for the new flag was dictated from Moscow, although it is not known who the Soviet official was that designed the flag. Before its formal adoption, the flag remained in official use.

The design of the flag was disclosed, along with a draft constitution, on 1 May 1948. On 10 July 1948 the new flag was approved by the provisional People's Assembly of North Korea. The following month Tu-bong, who formerly supported the traditional design, wrote a reasoned text On the Establishing of the New National Flag and the Abolition of Taegukgi. Thereby he explained the decision to adopt a new flag against the wishes of those who favored the old one. In terms of North Korean official texts, Tu-bong's account is unequivocally frank in acknowledging dissenting public opinion. In 1957, Kim Tu-bong was purged by Kim Il-sung who by that time had erected a cult of personality. Any mention of the use of Taegukgi was removed from texts and it was doctored out of photographs on the orders of Il-sung who sought to monopolize North Korean history to serve him and his regime. Contemporary official North Korean accounts now posit that the new flag of North Korea as personally designed by Il-sung.

Use in propaganda
A  North Korean national flag flies from a tall flagpole, which is located at Kijŏng-dong, on the North Korean side of the Military Demarcation Line within the Korean Demilitarized Zone.

Historical and other flags

There are several other known flags to be in use in North Korea by its regime. There are flags for the Korean People's Army (KPA), and its two subdivisions the Korean People's Air Force and Korean People's Navy, which follow a common design but with different colors (blue and white for the North Korean navy and dark blue and light blue for the North Korean air force). There is also a flag of the ruling Workers' Party of Korea that is modeled on similar communist party flags, and a flag for the Supreme Commander of the KPA used by Kim Jong-un, which has the Supreme Commander's arms on a red field. KPA Guards units use the same common design but with the national arms in the center of the obverse field.

See also

List of North Korean flags
Korean Unification Flag
Flag of South Korea
Order of the National Flag

References

Works cited

Further reading

External links 

North Korea
National symbols of North Korea
Korea, North
North Korea
Flags of North Korea